Pyrrhidium sanguineum  is a longhorn beetle  common in much of Europe. Its preferred food tree is oak.

References

Beetles of Europe
Cerambycidae
Beetles described in 1758
Taxa named by Carl Linnaeus